Griselinia jodinifolia known locally as yemo chico is a shrub with a natural distribution in Chile ranging from Maule Region (~35° S) in the north to Los Lagos Region (~41° S). It is found in near the coast.

References
 Florachilena.cl

Griseliniaceae
Shrubs
Flora of central Chile
Flora of southern Chile